The Nieman Foundation for Journalism at Harvard University awards multiple types of fellowships.

Nieman Fellowships for journalists
A Nieman Fellowship is an award given to journalists by the Nieman Foundation for Journalism at Harvard University. The fellowship is a transformative learning opportunity open to candidates working in all media in every country around the world.

Some two dozen fellowships are awarded annually, half to Americans and half to non-Americans.

As part of each class, specialized fellowships are also available: 
The Nieman-Berkman Fellowship in Journalism Innovation
The Abrams Nieman Fellowship for Local Investigative Journalism (open to U.S. candidates)
The Knight Visiting Nieman Fellowships

Additionally, "during years in which a watchdog journalist or investigative reporter from the United States is selected for a fellowship from the general application pool, the Nieman Foundation may offer the Murrey Marder Fellowship in Watchdog Reporting."

The Nieman–Berkman Fellowship in Journalism Innovation
This joint fellowship, awarded for the first time in 2012, is a joint fellowship between the Nieman Foundation and the Berkman Klein Center for Internet & Society that is awarded to U.S and international candidates with project proposals related to innovation in journalism.

The Abrams Nieman Fellowship for Local Investigative Journalism
Funded by the Abrams Foundation, the Abrams Nieman Fellowship for Local Investigative Journalism was created in 2018 to bolster deeply reported local and regional news stories in underserved areas throughout the United States. Candidates selected for the fellowship spend two semesters at Harvard and then receive financial support for up to nine months of fieldwork to develop an investigative project that will provide better, more in-depth coverage of issues important to the communities they serve.

The Knight Visiting Nieman Fellowship
Funded by the John S. and James L. Knight Foundation, this fellowship offers a short-term research opportunity to individuals interested in working on special projects designed to advance journalism in some new way. Candidates need not be practicing journalists, but must demonstrate the ways in which their work at Harvard and the Nieman Foundation may improve the prospects for journalism's future. This may be related to research, programming, design, financial strategies or another topic. Both U.S. and international applicants are invited to apply.

See also

 John S. Knight Fellowship (Stanford)
 Knight–Wallace Fellowship (University of Michigan)
 Knight–Bagehot Fellowship (Columbia)

References

External links
Nieman Fellowship application process
List of Nieman fellows by year since 1939
"The Nieman Fellowships:  Reflections from the First Two Women" - essays by Mary Ellen Leary and Charlotte FitzHenry, Niemen Fellows in 1946; published in 1979.

American journalism awards
 
Harvard University
Journalism fellowships
Scholarships in the United States